The 1936 Humboldt State Lumberjacks football team represented Humboldt State College during the 1936 college football season. They competed as an independent.

The 1936 Lumberjacks were led by second-year head coach Charlie Erb. They played home games at Albee Stadium in Eureka, California. Humboldt State finished with a record of six wins and three losses (6–3). The Lumberjacks outscored their opponents 139–66 for the season.

Schedule

Notes

References

Humboldt State
Humboldt State Lumberjacks football seasons
Humboldt State Lumberjacks football